Homoeothrix is a genus of tephritid  or fruit flies in the family Tephritidae.

Species
Homoeothrix lindigi (Hendel, 1914)

References

Tephritinae
Tephritidae genera
Diptera of South America